Marshal Peng Dehuai is a 2016 Chinese biographical historical drama television series directed by Song Yeming and written by Ma Jihong, Gao Jun and Xu Jiang, based on the life of Peng Dehuai (1898-1974), a prominent Chinese Communist military leader during the 20th century. The series stars Dong Yong as Peng Dehuai, alongside Yang Tongshu, Tang Guoqiang, Liu Jing, Wang Wufu, and Luo Gang.

Synopsis
This drama describes the life of Peng Dehuai (1898-1974), one of the Ten Marshals of the People's Republic of China.

Cast

Communist Party characters
 Dong Yong as Peng Dehuai, Communist military leader.
 Yang Tongshu as Pu Anxiu, Peng's wife.
 Tang Guoqiang as Mao Zedong, Communist Party leader and chairman of the Central Committee of the Chinese Communist Party.
 Luo Gang as young Mao Zedong.
  Liu Jing as Zhou Enlai, Communist Party leader and Prime Minister of the State Council of the People's Republic of China.
 Wang Wufu as Zhu De, commander in chief of the Red Army.
 Zhang Jingsheng as young Zhu De.
 Luo Gang as Zuo Quan, a senior military figure who died in the war.
 Wang Pengkai as Xi Zhongxun
 Michelle Bai (Bai Bing) as Qi Xin, Xi Zhongxun's wife.

Kuomintang characters
 Ma Xiaowei as Chiang Kai-shek
 Wen Xin as Soong May-ling
 Yang Meng as He Yingqin
 Xu Yongge as Hu Zongnan
 Cheng Yu as Yan Xishan

Supporting
 Sun Jiajia as Peng Gang, Peng's niece.
 Shan Wenxian as Peng Meikui, Peng's niece.
 Liu Sibo as Peng Qichao, Peng's nephew.
 Pu Cunxin as Yang Xianzhen, president of the Central Party School of the Chinese Communist Party.
 Lu Zhong as Huang Gonglue, Peng's brothers in arms and close friend.
 Song Yu as Guo Bingsheng
 Zhao Jun as Mao Anying, Mao's son.
 Zhang Zaixin as Liu Bocheng, division commander of the 129th division.
 Liu Jian as Chen Geng
 Shi Xin as Deng Xiaoping
 Wang Jian as Ren Bishi
 Chen Shanshan as Lin Biao
 Wang Yingxin as Nie Rongzhen
 Li Xinhua as Yang Shangkun
 Ma Yan as Wang Zhen
 Wang Zhuo as Ye Ting
 Zhou Bo as Teng Daiyuan
 Su Yujie as Shi Tou
 Ai Dong as Deng Hua
 Zhao Ji as Li Jiyun
 Yasuyuki Hirata as Yasuji Okamura, commander-in-chief of the Japanese Northern China Area Army.
 Ding Haifeng as Zhang Xueliang
 Zhu Haijun as He Changgong
 Zhang Huizhong as Wei Lihuang
 Fu Yong as Jin Ruilong
 Xie Zibing as Liu Yue
 Cao Li as Duan Dechang
 Miao Qing as Qiu'er
 Li Jiaming as Song Weiguo
 Tang Yinuo as Jing Xizhen
 Jiang Jing as Liu Yan
 Liu Yijun

Production
In 2010s, the Peng Dehuai Memorial Hall, the TV Art Center of the General Logistics Department of the PLA and the CCTV Production Center were planning TV series about Peng Dehuai. Xi Jinping (General Secretary of the Central Committee of the Chinese Communist Party), Fan Changlong (Vice Chairman of the Central Military Commission), Xu Qiliang (Vice Chairman of the Central Military Commission), and Liu Yuan (general) agreed the project.

In the autumn of 2014, Ren Zhonglun, the CEO of Shanghai Film Group, hired Ma Jihong to write the script for the series. On January 6, 2015, Zhou Xuzhou, the CEO of Hong Kong Yuye Group, signed a 15 million yuan investment agreement and also sponsored 2 million yuan in his own name. In December 2014, Song Yeming (Charging Out Amazon) was signed to direct the series.

Dong Yong was cast as the lead role Peng Dehuai, he said in an interview: "My parents once took part in the Korean War (1950-1953), they have deep feelings about Peng Dehuai. It is the first time that I play a great man, and it is both pressure and motivation for myself." Before playing Peng Dehuai, he read 11 biographies of Peng.

Production started on 20 December 2014 and ended on 20 May 2015.  Most of the film was shot on location in Hebei, Shanxi, Zhejiang, and Shandong. Zhao Nanqi (general) and Liu Yuan serves as its general counsel.

Music

Broadcast
Marshal Peng Dehuai was broadcast on CCTV-1 in May 2016.

The series received mainly positive reviews. Kong Li of thepaper said: "The series shaped a flesh and blood hero: Peng Dehuai". Li Zhun, a Mao Dun Literary Prize laureate, said: "This is a breakthrough success in the creation of Peng Dehuai's film and TV dramas, and it is an important harvest for the creation of the major historical revolution." Zhong Chengxiang, the former vice president of the China Federation of Literary and Art Circles (CFLAC) said: "This work completely reproduces the artistic image of Marshal Peng Dehuai in front of today's audience."

Accolades

References

External links
 Marshal Peng Dehuai CCTV 

2016 Chinese television series debuts
2016 Chinese television series endings
Chinese period television series
Chinese documentary television series
Television series set in the Qing dynasty
Cultural depictions of Mao Zedong
Cultural depictions of Zhou Enlai
Cultural depictions of Zhu De
Cultural depictions of Liu Shaoqi
Cultural depictions of Deng Xiaoping
Cultural depictions of Peng Dehuai
Cultural depictions of Chiang Kai-shek